HMS Abundance was a Royal Navy transport launched and purchased in 1799. The Admiralty sold her in 1823.

Career
Abundance was a mercantile vessel that the Admiralty purchased on the stocks. She was commissioned in 1800 under William Price, Master, for the East Indies. She returned to Woolwich for repairs between October and December 1802, and then returned to the East Indies.

On 5 January 1803 she sailed for the Mediterranean but grounded the next day on Sconce Point, near The Needles, Isle of Wight.  and  sailed to her assistance. By the 11th they had gotten her off with little damage and she then sailed for Gibraltar. 

All vessels survived.

On 1 May 1804  spoke with Abundance off Port Royal, Jamaica. She and her convoy from Portsmouth were "all well". After her return to Britain, Abundance sailed for the Mediterranean. 

On 28 January 1806, Abundance sailed from Portsmouth with a fleet for the West Indies. By 23 March she, the storeship , and ten of the fleet were at Barbados, having separated from the rest of the fleet shortly after their departure from Britain.

In 1806 Abundance came under the command of John Fryer, Master. Then later that year Josiah Oakes, Master, took command. He would remain in command, except for a break in 1812 when W. Kirby temporarily replaced him, until 1815. On 6 November Oakes sailed Abundance for the West Indies.

They arrived in March 1808 after a voyage of 12 weeks. They brought recruits for the 29th, 72nd, and 93rd regiments of foot.

While under Oakes's command Abundance recaptured Sedulous on 9 February 1813. Sedulous, Mills, master, had been sailing from Cephalonia to Hull when a French privateer had taken her. Sedulous reached Portsmouth on 10 February.

In May 1816 Abundance left Antwerp with statues and paintings that Napoleon and his officers had stolen; she then conveyed the art safely to Civita Vechia. The largest item was a statue of the Nile, and weighed 17,600 pounds. Cardinal Ercole Consalvi, Minister of State, came down from Rome on behalf of Pope Pius VII. A large state dinner followed, and the Cardinal invited all of Abundances officers to come to Rome at the Pope's expense. The officers did so, together with the British consul, travelling in the Pope's own coach. In Rome they immediately met the Pope, with Oakes kissing the Pope's hand three times, and then spent several days being shown the sights, before returning to their vessel. Abundance arrived at Portsmouth on 16 October with 60 cases of statuary and other gifts from the Pope. The Prince Regent, later George IV, wrote the Pope a letter of thanks.

Later in October the Admiralty delivered Abundance to the Committee for Distressed Seamen as an accommodation ship. However, between August 1818 and March 1819, she underwent modifications for service as a storeship. She then sailed to Saint Helena. At the time she was under the command of Lieutenant Robert Campbell.

Abundance was at Saint Helena when Napoleon died. She then sailed for Britain on 21 June 1821 and was laid up at Deptford in August.

Fate
The Admiralty put Abundance up for sale at Deptford in May 1823.  She was sold on the 22nd to Mr. Levy for £2,600.

Notes, citations, and references
Notes

Citations

References
 Boyden, Peter B. (2001) The British Army in Cape Colony: soldiers' letters and diaries, 1806-58. (Society for Army Historical Research - Cape of Good Hope, South Africa).
 
 
 

1799 ships
Ships of the Royal Navy
Ships built on the Beaulieu River